A Window in London is a 1940 British thriller film directed by Herbert Mason, written by Brigid Cooper and Ian Dalrymple for Greenspan & Seligman Enterprises Ltd and distributed by General Film Distributors. The cast includes Michael Redgrave, Patricia Roc, Sally Gray, Paul Lukas and Hartley Power. It is a remake of the French film Metropolitan (1939). The plot focuses on a man who becomes drawn to the wife of a jealous magician - after spotting what appears to be a murder in their flat.

The film is set in London, and was made when Waterloo Bridge was still under construction. It was released in the US in 1942 under the title Lady in Distress and released to cinemas in the United Kingdom on 15 June, 1940.

Plot
Pat (Patricia Roc) is a hotel switchboard operator at an exclusive London apartment block (the exterior location is actually Dolphin Square). She completes her night shift exhausted and has forgotten to give a client his 6am alarm call. She walks cheerfully home to her new husband, Peter (Michael Redgrave) a crane operator. They are a happy, well-meaning couple. However, because of their different shifts during the day they have no time for each other. While he works during the day on the construction of Waterloo Bridge, his patient wife works during the night on a hotel telephone exchange.

One morning Peter is on the train on his way to work, and spots what seems to be a murder being committed on a balcony: a man stabbing a woman. Deciding to investigate this "crime" Peter and a policeman arrive at the residence. There they find out that the couple were in fact rehearsing an illusion for a stage act. Zoltini is a bad-tempered magician and his wife Vivienne (Sally Gray) is his assistant. Peter offers Zoltini money to ease his alleged problems. He takes the dummy knife as a souvenir of the event. The policeman takes Peter's name and address so the inspector can thank him. Zoltini mocks Peter after he leaves. Peter gets threatened with the sack for being late, a pressman intervenes and tries to get a story. Peter's picture and the story appear in the paper before the end of the working day, calling him a hero. Because his workmates have seen the fake knife they mock him.

After work Peter goes to see Zoltini but only Vivienne is there. She invites him to come and see their show that evening. He gets home as the alarm goes off for Pat to go to work.

Max, an impresario, offers to take Vivienne away and get her better work. Peter arrives in the dressing room to collect his free ticket. Zoltini appears and gets very jealous. He throws the money he borrowed in Peter's face.

The suspicious magician becomes sure that his wife is having an affair with Peter - every time he sees her with the handsome stranger. On another night Zoltini and Vivienne have an argument offstage - leading to him slapping her in the face immediately before the show starts. In his final showcase trick Viviene should disappear and reappear in a trunk. She disappears but is not in the trunk much to his embarrassment. Vivienne has left in a taxi with Peter. They go up to his crane on Waterloo Bridge and Peter kisses her. A night watchman below hears them moving around and talking. They leave and go to Max's nightclub.

Pat arrives at work and gets the sack for her shortcomings on the night before.

Zoltini gets the sack too. He sits in a cafe and questions the taxi driver.

In the nightclub Max gives Peter a girl (Andrea) to talk to and sits with Vivienne. Peter gets drunk on champagne and starts singing with the band. Viviene realises she has left her handbag in the crane. She insists they go back. The night watchman has already found it and passes Peter the bag. Zoltini arrives and a fist fight begins. Zoltini lands in the river. Peter thinks he has drowned. When he returns to the nightclub Vivienne is signing a contract with Max. He tells her that he has killed Zoltini.

Meanwhile at the hotel the guest who missed his flight is actually pleased as the flight crashed. He insists that the hotel re-employ Pat.

Peter walks the streets in a daze. Pat marches home in an elated mood, as she has been given a day job. Peter says he has killed a man. They think a knock on the door is the police but it is the night watchman saying the river police pulled Zoltini out alive. Zoltini reconciles with Vivienne. But as a happy Pat & Peter go past their window on the train, Zoltini finds Vivienne's contract and a ticket Max put in her purse and shoots her dead. She falls in a position where she cannot be seen just as the train passes. Peter tells Pat that is the window where it all started and hopes they are as happy as themselves.

Cast

 Michael Redgrave as Peter
 Sally Gray as Vivienne
 Paul Lukas as Louis Zoltini
 Hartley Power as Max Preston
 Patricia Roc as Pat
 Glen Alyn as Andrea
 Gertrude Musgrove as Peggy the second telephonist
 George Carney as Night Watchman
 Bryan Coleman as Constable
 Alf Goddard as Tiny
 Wilfred Walter as Foreman
 George Merritt as Manager
 John Salew as Reporter
 Kimberley And Page as Specialities
 Pamela Randell as Specialities
 Eliot Makeham as Doorman (uncredited)

Production

Filming took place at Waterloo Bridge which was still under construction. Filming also took place at the Thames, Embankment, the Chelsea Palace, the Savoy Court, Dolphin Square and on the London District Railway. On 8 June 1939, Kinematograph Weekly announced that exterior scenes would "be filmed at Baron's Court Underground Station and in Parliament Square."

Eliot Makeham who had an uncredited role as the doorman previously had roles in Mason's East Meets West and Take My Tip. In the past when Patricia Roc saw several West End productions, she saw "many of the great actors" (including Michael Redgrave) perform on stage. The "central plot" of A Window in London inspired Jules White's Hiss and Yell.

Release

A Window in London was released theatrically in London in 1940 and 1942 in USA. The running time of the American release was 8 minutes shorter than the original running time. In July 2015 (over 75 years after the film's theatrical release), the BFI launched the Britain On Film archive, in which thousands of unseen films (including A Window in London) have been digitised and available for viewing via the BFI player. Later that year as part of the London on Film season from September to October, A Window in London was shown at BFI Southbank (near where filming took place).

Reception

Despite being a rare and unseen film for 75 years, the film has recently been praised for the location used for shooting. At the time, A Window in London was generally well received and marked out for the direction and narration. The Monthly Film Bulletin praised the film for the use of location and the cast. This film is considered to be Patricia Roc's "best acting" role - despite not having as large a role as the other actors of the main cast. Additionally the Monthly Film Bulletin said that, "Patricia Roc gives a charming little character study of a working girl wife." The Sydney Morning Herald said that "[the] story has the fascination of the unexpected."

Although the New York Times said that it was "muddily photographed and poorly directed", Michael Hodgson considers the film to be one of Mason's "interesting films" as well as "a dark and disturbing remake of Maurice Cam's French circular drama Metropolitain" in his biography about Patricia Roc. Tom Ryall mentioned that A Window in London contains similar themes to Hitchcock. Robyn Karney in Radio Times described the film as "a short, modest but intriguing British-made thriller with a satisfyingly neat twist in the tale". In 2015, BFI head curator Robin Baker said that, “Having [Waterloo Bridge] as a bridge over our own cinema and seeing it at that moment of appearing in a feature film is pretty fantastic. It is a darned good film as well.” Edd Elliott said that the film "lacks Hitchcockian suspense, but garners much of its contemporary’s narrative subtlety."

See also

 Waterloo Bridge

References

Bibliography

Primary sources

 Kinematograph Weekly, 27 April 1939
 Kinematograph Weekly, 8 June 1939
 The Cinema, 1 November 1939
 The Monthly Film Bulletin, November 1939
 London Life in New British Films, The Herald, 6 July 1939

Secondary sources

 Gourvish, Terry. (2014). Dolphin Square: The History of a Unique Building. A & C Black
 Hodgson, Michael. (2013). Patricia Roc. AuthorHouse (Paperback edition)
 F. Keaney, Michael. (2008). British Film Noir Guide. Performing Arts
 Leitch, Thomas and Poague, Lehand. (2011). A Companion to Alfred Hitchcock. John Wiley & Sons
 Maltin, Leonard. (2015). Turner Classic Movies Presents Leonard Maltin's Classic Movie Guide: From the Silent Era Through 1965. Penguin. Third edition
 Spicer, Andrew. (2010). Historical Dictionary of Film Noir. Scarecrow Press

External links

 A Window in London at Britmovie | Home of British Films
 A Window in London at BFI
 A Window in London at Park Circus
 A Window in London at AllMovie
 A Window in London at London on Location

1940 films
1940s English-language films
1940s thriller films
British thriller films
Films directed by Herbert Mason
Films with screenplays by Ian Dalrymple
British remakes of French films
British black-and-white films
Films set in London
1940s British films